The 2021 North Carolina Tar Heels football team represented the University of North Carolina at Chapel Hill as a member of Coastal Division of the Atlantic Coast Conference (ACC) for the 2021 NCAA Division I FBS football season. The Tar Heels were led by head coach Mack Brown, who was in the third season of his second stint at North Carolina and his 13th overall season at the university. The team played their home games at Kenan Memorial Stadium.

Personnel

Coaching staff

Roster

Offseason

Coaching changes
Larry Porter was hired in January for his second stint as the Tar Heels' running backs coach, replacing Robert Gillespie, who departed for the same position at Alabama. Porter's first tenure at UNC came under previous head coach Larry Fedora from 2014-2016. He was also given the title of Assistant Special teams coordinator. Former Tar Heel and NFL running back Natrone Means was also hired in the offseason as an offensive analyst.

Departures

NFL Draft

The following Tar Heels were selected in the 2021 NFL Draft.

Transfers
The Tar Heels lost sixteen players from the 2020 season.

†Denotes player who was listed as a senior by UNC, and chose to transfer elsewhere for the extra year of eligibility granted by the NCAA in response to the COVID-19 pandemic

Additions

Incoming transfers

Recruiting class
North Carolina signed 19 players in the 2021 class. The Tar Heels' class finished 14th in the 247Sports football recruiting rankings, 16th in the Rivals rankings, and 7th in the ESPN recruiting rankings. Eleven signees were ranked in the ESPN 300 top prospect list.

Schedule

The game against Wake Forest, a fellow member of the Atlantic Coast Conference, was played as a non-conference game and did not count in the league standings. This was done because the two rivals otherwise only play once every six years due to conference divisional alignment.

 The Duke's Mayo Bowl was the 59th edition of the North Carolina–South Carolina football rivalry. The two teams are next scheduled to kick off the 2023 season, also at Bank of America Stadium in Charlotte.

Game summaries

at Virginia Tech

Georgia State

Virginia

at Georgia Tech

Duke

Florida State

Miami

at No. 11 Notre Dame

No. 9 Wake Forest

at No. 25 Pittsburgh

Wofford

at No. 20 N.C. State

vs. South Carolina (Duke's Mayo Bowl)

Rankings

Players drafted into the NFL

References

North Carolina
North Carolina Tar Heels football seasons
North Carolina Tar Heels football